Åsa Annelie Charlotte Almblad-Lindefors (born April 28, 1972) is an ice hockey player from Sweden. She won a bronze medal at the 2002 Winter Olympics.

References

1972 births
Living people
Ice hockey players at the 2002 Winter Olympics
Medalists at the 2002 Winter Olympics
Olympic bronze medalists for Sweden
Olympic ice hockey players of Sweden
Olympic medalists in ice hockey
Swedish women's ice hockey players
Ice hockey players at the 1998 Winter Olympics